Inductive data type may refer to:

 Algebraic data type, a datatype each of whose values is data from other datatypes wrapped in one of the constructors of the datatype
 Inductive family, a family of inductive data types indexed by another type or value
 Recursive data type, a data type for values that may contain other values of the same type

See also 
 Inductive type
 Induction (disambiguation)

Type theory
Dependently typed programming